Casarsa della Delizia, simply known as Casarsa, is a comune (municipality) in the Province of Pordenone in the Italian region Friuli-Venezia Giulia, located about  northwest of Trieste and about  east of Pordenone.
 
Casarsa della Delizia borders the following municipalities: Arzene, Fiume Veneto, San Vito al Tagliamento, Valvasone, Zoppola. It houses the tomb of local poet and writer Pier Paolo Pasolini, as well as Didactic Center based in his mother's house.

People
Elio Ciol
Bryan Cristante
The Jacuzzi brothers
Gioacchino Muccin
Nico Naldini
Pier Paolo Pasolini
Zefferino Tomè
Ezio Vendrame

Transport
Casarsa railway station is on the busy Venice–Udine railway. Train services operate to Venice, Treviso, Udine, Trieste, Portogruaro, Padua, Bologna and Rome.

References

External links

 Official website

Cities and towns in Friuli-Venezia Giulia